The McWhorter School of Pharmacy is an American pharmacy school located in Birmingham, Alabama. The school offers a four-year Doctor of Pharmacy (Pharm.D) degree, and is nationally accredited by the ACPE.

History
McWhorter was established January 31, 1927 as the Howard College Department of Pharmacy as one of Samford University's ten schools, with a handful of students and a small number of faculty. It is named after R. Clayton McWhorter.

The original School of Pharmacy opened in 1927 and closed in 1929 due to national economic difficulty and new accredidation requirements. In 1932, the School of Pharmacy reopened.

Degree Programs
McWhorter School of Pharmacy currently offers the following programs:

 Doctor of Pharmacy (Pharm.D.)
 Joint degrees
 Pharm.D./Master of Business Administration
 Pharm.D./Master of Healthcare Administration
 Pharm.D./Master of Public Health
 Pharm.D./Master of Science in Health Informatics and Analytics 
 Pharm.D./Master of Science in Nutrition
 Pharm.D./Master of Studies in Law with a Concentration in Health Law and Compliance
 Technician training

The School of Pharmacy has a pre-pharmacy program for students who wish to fast track their education in a 2/4 model.

Admissions
The Admissions committee reviews applications for an entering Fall Class. The application and transcript deadline is March 1, and is submitted via PharmCAS. The School of Pharmacy typically admits about 80-95 students annually out of an applicant pool of about 200.

References

External links

Pharmacy schools in Alabama
Samford University
Educational institutions established in 1927
University subdivisions in Alabama
1927 establishments in Alabama